Igor Vladimirovich Nekrasov (born 10 April 1975) is a Russian former professional footballer.

Club career
He made his professional debut in the Russian Second Division in 1992 for FC Dynamo-2 Moscow.

Personal life
He is the younger brother of Sergei Nekrasov.

Honours
 Russian Premier League runner-up: 1994.
 Russian Cup winner: 1995 (was in the starting lineup in the final game).

References

1975 births
Footballers from Moscow
Living people
Russian footballers
Russia under-21 international footballers
Association football midfielders
Association football defenders
FC Dynamo Moscow players
Russian Premier League players
FC Khimki players
FC Zvezda Irkutsk players